This is a list of Members of the United Kingdom House of Lords who were born, live or lived in Northern Ireland.

This list does not include hereditary peers whose only parliamentary service was in the House  of Lords prior to the passage of the House of Lords Act 1999, and who lost their seats under that Act. Nor does it include those in the Peerage of Ireland, who have never had an automatic right to a seat in the House of Lords at Westminster.

There is no such thing as the Peerage of Northern Ireland and peers do not represent geographic areas as such. Some do, however, choose titles which reflect geographical localities, e.g. Lord Kilclooney; this is, however, entirely nominal.

Current members

Living former members

The Duke of Abercorn former Ulster Unionist Westminster MP
 The Lord Glentoran, elected hereditary peer, son and grandson of Ulster Unionist Stormont MPs
 The Baroness Paisley of St. George's, Vice-president of the Democratic Unionist Party, widow of Lord Bannside
 The Lord Carswell, former Lord Chief Justice of Northern Ireland and  Law Lord

Deceased members

 The 4th Duke of Abercorn, member of the Senate of Northern Ireland.
 The Lord Ballyedmond, businessman and member of the Conservative Party. Previously, he sat as a Fianna Fáil senator in Seanad Éireann in Dublin.
 The Lord Bannside, First Minister of Northern Ireland and founding leader of the Democratic Unionist Party (DUP).
 The Lord Blease, trade unionist and one-time member of the Northern Ireland Labour Party
 The Baroness Blood Trade unionist and women's campaigner
 The 1st Viscount Brookeborough, Prime Minister of Northern Ireland, leader of the Ulster Unionist Party
 The 2nd Viscount Brookeborough, Ulster Unionist Stormont MP
 The Lord Cooke of Islandreagh, member of the Senate of Northern Ireland
 The 1st Viscount Craigavon, Prime Minister of Northern Ireland, leader of the Ulster Unionist Party
 The 4th Lord Dunleath, Alliance Party Stormont MP.
 The Lord Faulkner of Downpatrick, Prime Minister of Northern Ireland, Chief Executive of Northern Ireland, leader of the Ulster Unionist Party
 The Lord Fitt, founder leader of the Social Democratic and Labour Party (SDLP)
 The 1st Lord Glentoran, Ulster Unionist Stormont MP.
 The 2nd Lord Glentoran, Ulster Unionist Stormont MP.
 The Lord Hutton, Lord Chief Justice of Northern Ireland and Law Lord
 The Lord Kerr of Tonaghmore, Justice of the Supreme Court of the United Kingdom, Lord Chief Justice of Northern Ireland and Law Lord 
 The Lord Laird, chairman of the Ulster-Scots Agency and Stormont MP 
 The Lord Lowry, Lord Chief Justice of Northern Ireland
 The Lord MacDermott,  Lord Chief Justice of Northern Ireland
 Lord Mawhinney,  Conservative  Shadow Home Secretary, Minister without Portfolio, Secretary of State for Transport and  Minister of State for Health
 The Lord McConnell, Ulster Unionist Stormont MP
 The Lord Molyneaux of Killead, leader of the Ulster Unionist Party
 The Lord Moyola, Prime Minister of Northern Ireland and Ulster Unionist leader.
 The Lord O'Neill of the Maine, Prime Minister of Northern Ireland, leader of the Ulster Unionist Party.
 The 1st Lord Rathcavan, Ulster Unionist Westminster and Stormont MP.
 The 2nd Lord Rathcavan, Ulster Unionist and, later, Alliance Party politician. 
 The 27th Baroness de Ros, suo jure peeress.
 The Lord Smith of Clifton, Liberal Democrat spokesman on Northern Ireland
 The Lord Steinberg, businessman and member of the Conservative Party
 The Lord Trimble First Minister of Northern Ireland, leader of the Ulster Unionist Party. 
 The 5th Duke of Westminster, Ulster Unionist Westminster MP.

Notes

References

See also
 Edward Carson, Baron Carson - Irish Unionist politician and British Lord of Appeal in Ordinary, originally from Dublin.
 Demographics and politics of Northern Ireland
 List of Northern Ireland members of the Privy Council

Northern Ireland
Lords
Northern Ireland